Dundas may refer to:

Places

Australia 

 Dundas, New South Wales
 Dundas, Queensland, a locality in the Somerset Region
 Dundas, Tasmania
 Dundas, Western Australia
 Fort Dundas, a settlement in the Northern Territory 1824–1828
 Shire of Dundas, Western Australia

Canada 
 Dundas Island (British Columbia), the largest of the Dundas Islands
 Dundas Island (Nunavut)
 Dundas Parish, New Brunswick

Ontario
 Dundas, Ontario
 Dundas station (Dundas, Ontario), a former railway station in Dundas
 Dundas County, Ontario

Toronto
 Yonge–Dundas Square, a public square in downtown Toronto
 Dundas Street, Toronto
Dundas station (Toronto), a subway station on Dundas Street

Greenland 
Dundas, Greenland, a former settlement known as the trading place established by Knud Rasmussen and Peter Freuchen in 1910 in the North Star Bay across Pituffik (Thule Air Base)

Hong Kong 

 Dundas Street, Hong Kong

New Zealand 

 Dundas Island, New Zealand

United Kingdom 

 Dundas Aqueduct, Wiltshire, England
 Port Dundas, Glasgow, Scotland

United States 
Dundas, Minnesota
Dundas, Ohio
Dundas, Virginia
Dundas, Wisconsin

People
 Dundas (surname)

Other
 Charlotte Dundas, the first practical steamboat
 Clan Dundas, a Scottish clan
 Dundas Castle, near Edinburgh
 Dundas Cactus Festival, an event held in Dundas, Ontario, Canada
 Dundas Data Visualization, a commercial software company from Ontario, Canada.